Xenosphingia is a genus of moths in the family Sphingidae, containing one species, Xenosphingia jansei, which is known from arid bush in western Zimbabwe and adjoining Botswana.

The wingspan is 54–65 mm.

References

Smerinthini
Monotypic moth genera

Moths of Africa
Taxa named by Karl Jordan
Moths described in 1920